The Moore Ministry was the 9th Ministry of the Government of Western Australia and was led by Ministerialist Premier Newton Moore. It succeeded the Rason Ministry on 7 May 1906 after Rason resigned to accept an appointment as Agent-General for Western Australia in London. It was succeeded by the First Wilson Ministry on 16 September 1910 after Moore resigned for exactly the same reason.

On 7 May 1906, the Governor, Admiral Sir Frederick Bedford, designated 6 principal executive offices of the Government under section 43(2) of the Constitution Acts Amendment Act 1899. The following ministers were then appointed to the positions, and served until the reconstitution of the Ministry on 30 June 1909.

On 30 June 1909, the Ministry was reconstituted following the resignation of Norbert Keenan. The Ministers sworn in then served until the end of the Ministry on 16 September 1910.

References

  (no ISBN)

Western Australian ministries
Ministries of George V
Ministries of Edward VII